Nomasonto Evelyn Motaung (born 1985 or 1986) is a South African politician who was elected as a Member of Parliament (MP) for the African National Congress in the 2019 national election. In March 2023, she was appointed as Deputy Minister in the Presidency.

Political career
In 2019, Motaung stood for election to the South African National Assembly as 84th on the ANC's national list. She was elected to the National Assembly and was sworn in as a Member of Parliament on 22 May 2019. At the age of 33, she was one of the youngest MPs elected at the election. She served on the Portfolio Committee on Trade and Industry.

In May 2020, Motaung asked why there was so much "noise with journalists" when the lotteries commission claimed to be operating so efficiently.

In April 2021, Motaung was named to the newly established African National Congress Youth League National Youth Task Team.

In March 2023, she was appointed as Deputy Minister in the Presidency by president Cyril Ramaphosa.

References

External links

Profile at Parliament of South Africa

Living people
Year of birth missing (living people)
Tswana people
Members of the National Assembly of South Africa
Women members of the National Assembly of South Africa
African National Congress politicians